These are the Billboard Top R&B/Hip-Hop Albums that peaked at number-one in 2000.

Chart history

See also
2000 in music
List of number-one R&B singles of 2000 (U.S.)

2000